Nippo may refer to:

Companies and organizations
 Nippo, colloquial name for 
 Nippo Batteries, an Indian battery manufacturer
 Nippo Corporation, a Japanese construction company and sponsor of cycling teams
 EF Education–Nippo, a cycling team that competed during 2021
 Nippo–Provence–PTS Conti, a cycling team formed in November 2020
 Nippo–Vini Fantini–Faizanè, a cycling team that competed from 2008 to 2019

Places
 Nippō Kaigan Quasi-National Park, in Japan
 Nippo Pond, a body of water in Barrington, New Hampshire

Other
 Nippo, a Japanese male villain in the Shazam family of comic book characters during the 1940s and 1950s
 Nippo Jisho, a Japanese to Portuguese dictionary of the 17th century
 Nippō Main Line, a railway line in southern Japan

See also
 
 Nippon (disambiguation)